Octavius Hadfield (6 October 1814 – 11 December 1904) was Archdeacon of Kapiti, Bishop of Wellington from 1870 to 1893 and Primate of New Zealand from 1890 to 1893. He was a member of the Church Missionary Society (CMS) for thirty years. He was recognised as an authority on Māori customs and language. His views on Māori rights, expressed in several books strongly criticised the actions of the New Zealand Government. Hadfield married Catherine (Kate) Williams (24 February 1831 – 8 January 1902) a daughter of the Rev. Henry Williams and Marianne Williams.

Background
He was born into an affluent family but often had very poor health and nearly died on several occasions. He received an excellent university education but did not finish his degree due to ill health. As a member of a wealthy family he was able to tour though Europe. Normally, lack of a degree would have prevented him being ordained but he was able to secure a position in New Zealand.

Church ministry
He joined the CMS in October 1837. Hadfield was admitted to deacon's orders in September 1838 in Sydney by Bishop Broughton, bishop of Australia.

He was very friendly with Samuel Marsden but did not share his views on high church Anglicanism. The CMS missionaries held the low church beliefs that were common among the 19th century Evangelical members of the Anglican Church.

Church Missionary Society
In December 1838 Hadfield arrived in the Bay of Islands, in M.S. Pelorus, travelling with Bishop Broughton, who was making a pastoral visit to the native church established by the CMS among the Māori. On 6 January 1839 he became the first priest to be ordained in New Zealand. Hadfield was stationed at Paihia in the Bay of Islands.

Following a request by Tāmihana Te Rauparaha and Mātene Te Whiwhi for a missionary in their area, Hadfield travelled with Henry Williams to establish an CMS mission on the Kapiti Coast in November 1839. Riwai Te Ahu, who later became an Anglican minister,  was baptised by Hadfield at the Waikanae Mission in 1840. Pineaha Te Mahauariki, who also became an Anglican minister,  was baptised by Hadfield in 1842. In December 1843 Bishop Selwyn, the first Anglican Bishop of New Zealand, attended Otaki to confirm a young chief and 142 of his followers.

Bishop Selwyn appointed him rural dean of the Western District of Wellington and Taranaki in 1844 and as archdeacon of Kapiti in March 1849.

Relations with the Māori
During his early years he travelled throughout the Wellington region that had been conquered by numerous Taranaki tribes. He became close friends with the Ngāti Toa leader Te Rauparaha who had led the invasion of the wider Wellington region during the long running Musket Wars. It was Te Rauparaha's Christian son Tāmihana who had invited him to the Māori community to live. Hadfield buried Te Rauparaha in 1849 after his release from imprisonment.

Te Āti Awa built the first church within the Waikanae pā which inspired other churches, including Rangiātea, built by Ngāti Raukawa in Otaki during 1848-1851.

He became part of the Ōtaki Ngāti Raukawa community where he made every effort to learn Māori language and customs and shared these with governor George Grey. They went to the same church. He lived in the community for 30 years, established 20 mission schools and became well integrated into the Māori community. In 1852 he published a spelling book for Māori children. Later he became increasingly intolerant and dogmatic in his views as he clashed with the government. He lived in an age when the early influence of missionaries had declined.

Aftermath of the Wairau Affray
Following the Wairau Affray in 1843, where a confrontation between Te Rauparaha and group of settlers left twenty-two Europeans dead, many settlers believed an attack on then thinly populated Wellington was possible and Hadfield was seen as a peacemaker preventing the spread of hostilities.

Hadfield's support of Wiremu Kīngi's claim to Waitara
Hadfield became far less popular when in 1860, Hadfield upheld Wiremu Kīngi's claim to the Waitara block.  The surveying of this land prior to military occupation precipitated the First Taranaki War, and Hadfield became a leading critic of the Government in these actions. He "was for some time the most unpopular man in the colony". He was described in the press at the time as "a traitor and a bigoted meddlesome missionary".

Wi Parata v the Bishop of Wellington
In 1877 Wiremu Parata took Hadfield and the Church to court over a gift of land which was not used for a school as intended; the far-reaching case Wi Parata v the Bishop of Wellington was lost when the Treaty of Waitangi was ruled a simple nullity.

Publications

 A discourse delivered at St. Peter's Church, Te Aro by Octavius Hadfield (Wellington, (N.Z.) : Robert Stokes, 1851)
 
 
 
 A reply to the question, Is a miracle opposed to reason? by Octavius Hadfield (Wellington (N.Z.) : Lyon and Blair, 1875)

See also
New Zealand Church Missionary Society

References

External links
Dictionary of New Zealand Biography: Octavius Hadfield
 

1814 births
1904 deaths
Anglican bishops of Wellington
Primates of New Zealand
Anglican missionaries in New Zealand
New Zealand writers
19th-century Anglican bishops in New Zealand
Archdeacons of Kapiti
English Anglican missionaries
English emigrants to New Zealand